Panesar is an Indian surname from Punjab. People with this surname include:
Balraj Panesar, Canadian field hockey player
Bhai Trilochan Singh Panesar, Indian social worker
Jitender Singh Panesar, Kenyan field hockey player
Manjeet Singh Panesar, Kenyan field hockey player
Monty Panesar, English international cricketer
Sukhi Panesar, Canadian field hockey Player
Surjeet Singh Panesar, Kenyan field hockey player

Fictional characters with this surname include:
 Ash Panesar, an EastEnders character
 Jags Panesar, an EastEnders character
 Kheerat Panesar, an EastEnders character
 Suki Panesar, an EastEnders character
 Vinny Panesar, an EastEnders character

See also 
 Panesar-e Tashkan, a village in Iran

Indian surnames
Surnames of Indian origin
Punjabi-language surnames